Endicott is an MBTA Commuter Rail station in Dedham, Massachusetts. It serves the Franklin Line. It is located off Grant Avenue near East Street. The station is not accessible.

History
The Norfolk County Railroad opened its Boston Extension (the Midland Branch) from Islington to Boston on January 1, 1855, to end its dependence on the Boston and Providence Railroad for access to downtown Boston. East Street (later known as Elmwood, then Endicott) was among the original stops on the extension. The line was closed from July 14, 1855, until late 1856 due to a lawsuit over grade crossings in Dorchester, and from 1858 to February 11, 1867, due to financial difficulties of various railroads attempting to operate the line. Endicott has been continuously open since 1867, with service via the Midland Branch until 1898 and thereafter mostly via the B&P mainline. A depot building with a ticket office was formerly present at the station.

When Dedham Corporate Center station was being constructed in the 1980s, the MBTA considered either closing Endicott station or adding a pedestrian underpass, but neither action was taken. In 2019, the MBTA announced plans to replace the bridge immediately adjacent to the station over East Street. The bridge, which was originally constructed in 1904, is expected to be replaced by the fall of 2022. In 2019, the MBTA listed Endicott as a "Tier I" accessibility priority.

See also
 History of rail in Dedham, Massachusetts

References

External links

MBTA - Endicott
Station from Google Maps Street View

MBTA Commuter Rail stations in Norfolk County, Massachusetts
Stations along New York and New England Railroad lines
Railway stations in Dedham, Massachusetts
1855 establishments in Massachusetts
Railway stations in the United States opened in 1855